George Rogers Shirkey (August 20, 1936 – February 18, 2022) was a former American football defensive tackle who played three seasons in the American Football League with the Houston Oilers and Oakland Raiders. He was drafted by the San Francisco 49ers in the sixteenth round of the 1958 NFL Draft. He played college football at Stephen F. Austin State University and attended Fort Stockton High School in Fort Stockton, Texas.

References

External links
Just Sports Stats

1936 births
2022 deaths
Players of American football from Texas
American football defensive tackles
Stephen F. Austin Lumberjacks football players
Houston Oilers players
Oakland Raiders players
People from Fort Stockton, Texas
American Football League players